Barrington Reginald "Barry" Brown (20 May 1931 – 1 November 2004) was a New Zealand professional welter/middleweight boxer of the 1950s who won the New Zealand Boxing Association welterweight title, New Zealand Boxing Association middleweight title, and British Empire welterweight title, his professional fighting weight varied from , i.e. welterweight to , i.e. middleweight.

Professional boxing record

References

External links

Image - Barry Brown
Image - Barry Brown

1931 births
2004 deaths
Middleweight boxers
Sportspeople from Dannevirke
New Zealand professional boxing champions
Place of death missing
Welterweight boxers
New Zealand male boxers
Commonwealth Boxing Council champions
20th-century New Zealand people
21st-century New Zealand people